Dexter Browne is an international footballer, who played as a defender.

Biography 

Browne was born in Saint Vincent and the Grenadines. He played for the Saint Vincent and the Grenadines national football team between 1996 and 2007. After the 2007 games he was one of several of the team to retire from international football.

He took part in the 1996 CONCACAF Gold Cup in the United States. He played two games in the competition: against Mexico, and Guatemala. In 2019 the team was honoured for being the only team to have got to the CONCACAF Gold Cup.

References 

1976 births
Living people
Saint Vincent and the Grenadines footballers
Saint Vincent and the Grenadines international footballers
Association football defenders